The North Jutland Region, or in some official sources, the North Denmark Region, is an administrative region of Denmark established on 1 January 2007 as part of the 2007 Danish municipal reform, which abolished the traditional counties and set up five larger regions. At the same time, smaller municipalities were merged into larger units, cutting the number of municipalities from 271 before 1 January 2006, when Ærø Municipality was created, to 98. North Jutland Region has 11 municipalities. The reform diminished the power of the regional level dramatically in favor of the local level and the central government in Copenhagen.

Geography
The North Jutland Region consists of the former North Jutland County combined with parts of the former Viborg County (the former municipalities of Aalestrup, Hanstholm, Morsø, Sydthy, and Thisted), and the western half of Mariager Municipality (in the former Aarhus County).

Geologically, the region lies in the northern part of Denmark, which is rising because of post-glacial rebound.

Municipalities

The region is subdivided into 11 municipalities:
 Aalborg
 Brønderslev
 Frederikshavn
 Hjørring
 Jammerbugt
 Læsø
 Mariagerfjord
 Morsø
 Rebild
 Thisted
 Vesthimmerland

Towns

Economy 
The gross domestic product (GDP) of the region was €26.1 billion in 2018, accounting for 8.7% of Denmark's economic output. The GDP per capita adjusted for purchasing power was €33,200 or 110% of the EU27 average in the same year.

Culture and education 
One of Denmark's five universities, Aalborg University, is situated in the region. Most of the region's museums are situated in Aalborg such as the Historical Museum of Northern Jutland,  KUNSTEN Museum of Modern Art, Musikkens Hus, Utzon Center and Aalborg Zoo.

Regional Council
The five regions of Denmark each have a regional council of 41 members. These are elected every four years, during the local elections.

See also

References

External links

 

 
States and territories established in 2007
Regions of Denmark
2007 establishments in Denmark